Alaa Abd-El-Aziz is a Canadian academic and former President of the University of Prince Edward Island.

Early life 
Abd-El-Aziz completed his bachelor's and master's at the Ain Shams University in 1985 and 1989 respectively. He completed a PhD at the University of Saskatchewan in 1989.

Career 
Abd-El-Aziz joined the University of Toronto as a lecturer in 1989. In 1990, he joined the University of Winnipeg as an assistant professor and became a full professor in 1997 and worked there till 2006.

From 1991 to 2008, Abd-El-Aziz was an adjunct professor at the University of Manitoba. He was also an adjunct at the Université de Sherbrooke and the University of Winnipeg.

Abd-El-Aziz was the former Provost of University of British Columbia (Okanagan Campus). From 2006 to 2011, he was the professor of chemistry at University of British Columbia (Okanagan Campus).

Abd-El-Aziz's contract was renewed in 2015. Atlantic Business Magazine declared him innovator of the year in 2020.

References 

Living people
Academic staff of the University of Prince Edward Island
Ain Shams University alumni
University of Saskatchewan alumni
Academic staff of the University of Toronto
Academic staff of the University of Manitoba
Academic staff of the Université de Sherbrooke
Academic staff of University of Winnipeg
Egyptian emigrants to Canada
Year of birth missing (living people)